Thunder Warrior III is a 1988 Italian action film written and directed  by Fabrizio De Angelis (credited as Larry Ludman). It is the sequel to the 1987 film Thunder Warrior II, and the last film in the Thunder film series.

Premise
In an Indian reserve, the former military Magnum illegally set up a training camp for mercenaries. After these exalted destroy the Indian village, Thunder protested demanding justice from the authorities, but to no avail.

Cast
 Mark Gregory as Thunder
 John Phillip Law as Sheriff Jeff
 Horst Schön as Bill
 Werner Pochath as Colonel Magnum
 Ingrid Lawrence as Sheena
 Jeffrey Domo as Little Owl
 Bruce Miles as Bernie
 Duke Smith

Release
Thunder Warrior III was distributed on home video as Thunder Warrior 3 by American Imperial in the United Kingdom in August 1989.

References

External links
 

Italian action films
1988 action films
1988 films
English-language Italian films
Films directed by Fabrizio De Angelis
Films scored by Francesco De Masi
1980s English-language films
1980s Italian films